Presidio is a city in Presidio County, Texas, United States. It is situated on the Rio Grande (Río Bravo del Norte) River, on the opposite side of the U.S.–Mexico border from Ojinaga, Chihuahua. The name originates from Spanish and means "fortress". The population was 4,169 at the 2000 census, and had increased to 4,426 as of the 2010 US census.

History

The junction of the Rio Conchos and Rio Grande at Presidio was settled thousands of years ago by hunting and gathering peoples. By 1200 CE, the local Native Americans had adopted agriculture and lived in small, closely knit settlements, which the Spaniards later called pueblos. (See La Junta Indians)

On December 10, 1582, Antonio de Espejo and his company arrived at the site and called the pueblo San Juan Evangelista. By 1681, the area of Presidio was known as La Junta de los Ríos, or the Junction of the Rivers. Five Jumano towns were located along the Rio Grande to the north of the junction, consisting largely of permanent houses. In 1683, Juan Sabeata, the chief of the Jumano nation, reported having seen a fiery cross on the mountain at Presidio and requested that a mission be established at La Junta. The settlement in 1684 became known as La Navidad en Las Cruces. The missions La Navidad en las Cruces, San Francisco de los Julimes, San Antonio de los Puliques, Apostol Santiago, and Santa María de la Redonda may have been established on the Texas side of the Rio Grande at La Junta.

About 1760, a penal colony and military garrison of 60 men were established near Presidio. In 1830, the name of the area around Presidio was changed from La Junta de los Rios to Presidio del Norte. White American settlers came to Presidio in 1848 after the Mexican War. Among them was John Spencer, who operated a horse ranch on the United States side of the Rio Grande near Presidio. Ben Leaton and Milton Faver, former scalp hunters for the Mexican government, built private forts in the area.

During the Mexican Revolution, General Pancho Villa often used Ojinaga as his headquarters for operations and visited Presidio on numerous occasions.

In 1849, a Comanche raid almost destroyed Presidio, and in 1850, Indians drove off most of the cattle in town. A post office was established at Presidio in 1868, and the first public school was opened in 1887.

In 1897, President William McKinley appointed George B. Jackson, an African American former buffalo soldier, as customs collector at Presidio, a position he held until his death in 1900. Jackson, a businessman from San Angelo, was considered the "wealthiest colored man in Texas" in the second half of the 19th century.

As a result of General Francisco "Pancho" Villa's force's raid and capture of Ojinaga on January 10, 1914, many Mexican army troops and civilians fled to Presidio, seeking safe-haven.  U.S. forces detained 2,000 Mexican refugees in Presidio, eventually marching them north 60 miles to Camp Marfa.  The refugees would later be sent by train to Ft. Bliss (El Paso).

In 1930, the Kansas City, Mexico and Orient Railway reached Presidio and the Presidio–Ojinaga International Rail Bridge was built. The population grew from 96 in 1925 to 1,671 in 1988, but the number of businesses declined from 70 in 1933 to 22 in 1988. At the end of 1988, Presidio experienced a population boom, due in part to previously undocumented immigrants enrolled in the amnesty program. The population in 1990 was 3,422.  Despite Presidio's having been occupied continuously since ancient times, the community was finally incorporated in 1980, with Herb Myers elected as Presidio's first mayor.

The 1959 movie Rio Bravo featured the town, and in 1964 the movie Rio Conchos.

In 1986, the Texas Department of Transportation opened a two-lane bridge, connecting Presidio and Ojinaga, the Presidio–Ojinaga International Bridge.  By 2019, a second span will be constructed, with the original bridge being refurbished.  The increased bridge capacity is projected to meet higher traffic, mainly commercial and agricultural in nature.

As of 2020, Presidio's local economy is based largely upon employment at Presidio Independent School District, United States Customs and Border Protection, and local retail businesses.

In 2010, Presidio built the world's largest sodium-sulfur battery to provide power when the city's lone line to the United States power grid goes down.

Geography

Presidio is located at  (29.561272, –104.366522).

Presidio is located near the confluence of the Rio Conchos and the Rio Grande. The Rio Conchos flows in a northeasterly direction from its source in the Sierra Madre in the state of Chihuahua, Mexico. Commonly referred to as "La Junta" (the joining), the two rivers resulted in plentiful water, creating a flood plain that is ideal for farming.

Climate
 Coordinates: 
 Elevation:

Demographics

2020 census

As of the 2020 United States census, there were 3,264 people, 1,394 households, and 729 families residing in the city.

2010 census
As of the census of 2010, 5,106 people, 1,285 households, and 1,033 families resided in the city. The population density was 1,620.1 people per square mile (626.0/km). There were 1,541 housing units at an average density of 599.1 per square mile (231.5/km). The racial makeup of the city was 83.39% White, 0.10% African American, 0.14% Native American, 0.05% Asian, 0.02% Pacific Islander, 15.43% from other races, and 0.86% from two or more races. Hispanics or Latinos of any race were 94.12% of the population.

Of the 1,285 households, 49.3% had children under the age of 18 living with them, 62.6% were married couples living together, 14.4% had a female householder with no husband present, and 19.6% were not families. About 18.8% of all households were made up of individuals, and 10.5% had someone living alone who was 65 years of age or older. The average household size was 3.24 and the average family size was 3.73.

In the city, the age distribution of the population shows 37.2% under the age of 18, 8.7% from 18 to 24, 25.5% from 25 to 44, 17.4% from 45 to 64, and 11.1% who were 65 years of age or older. The median age was 28 years. For every 100 females, there were 89.9 males. For every 100 females age 18 and over, there were 84.8 males.

The median income for a household in the city was $18,031, and for a family was $19,601. Males had a median income of $20,469 versus $15,000 for females. The per capita income for the city was $7,098. About 40.4% of families and 43.0% of the population were below the poverty line, including 48.3% of those under age 18 and 64.5% of those age 65 or over.

Consular missions
The Consulate of Mexico in Presidio is in the city.

Education

The City of Presidio is served by the Presidio Independent School District, which includes Presidio Elementary School, Lucy Rede Franco Middle School, and Presidio High School.  In 2011, Shella R. Condino, physics teacher at Presidio High School, was unanimously chosen by the National Aviation Hall of Fame's selection committee to receive the 2011 A. Scott Crossfield Aerospace Education Teacher of the Year Award. In 2016, Dr. Edgar B. Tibayan, principal of Lucy Rede Franco Middle School was adjudged as Texas Principal of the Year. He represented the state of Texas in the search for National Principal of the Year in 2016.

The Presidio Schools count approximately 1,300 students, Pre-K through 12th grade.  Presidio students have competed nationally in rocketry, with a wide array of Science, Technology, Engineering and Math (STEM) classes and activities in which all students may participate.  The district also offers numerous activities in the fine arts, including art, band, jazz ensemble, mariachi and an annual school musical.

All Presidio schools are fully accredited by the Texas Education Agency.

Presidio County is within the Odessa College District for community college.

Tourism
Presidio is located three miles north of Ft Leaton State Historic Site.  Plans are underway to open Chinati Mountains State Natural Area, 15 northwest of Presidio, along FM 170.  Big Bend Ranch State Park is adjacent to Presidio with Ft. Leaton serving as a facility to purchase use permits.  Connecting Presidio south to Lajitas is the Camino del Rio (River Road), a 50-mile scenic drive following the Rio Grande.

Tourists often use Presidio as a less-congested gateway to Mexico at Ojinaga.  All travel permits are available, and Mexican vehicle insurance is also available nearby.  Ojinaga is a city of approximately 30,000, with tourist services including dining, shopping, and lodging.  Nearby sites of interest include Peguis Canyon, as well as the old mining village of Manuel Benavides.  Bus service to Chihuahua is available daily.

References

External links

 City of Presidio website

Cities in Presidio County, Texas
Rio Conchos
Texas populated places on the Rio Grande
Cities in Texas
Mexico–United States border crossings
Populated places established in 1684
1684 establishments in New Spain